Lonna Rae Atkeson (born July 2, 1965) is an American political scientist. She is a Professor of Political Science, Regents’ Lecturer, and Director of the Center for the Study of Voting, Elections and Democracy, and the Institute of Social Research at the University of New Mexico. She is also an Associate Editor of the political science journal Political Analysis.  Her research focuses on campaigns, elections, election administration, public opinion, political behavior, survey methodology, gender, and race and ethnicity.

Early life and education
Atkeson was born on July 2, 1965. She earned her Bachelor of Arts degree in political science from the University of California, Riverside and her doctoral degree in the same subject from the University of Colorado Boulder.

Career
Atkeson joined the faculty of political science at the University of New Mexico in 1995 as an assistant professor and was shortly thereafter promoted to UNM Regents' Lecturer. Beginning with the 2006 United States elections, Atkeson has published an election administration report detailing a systematic examination of New Mexico's November General Election. Some of her suggestions for improvement, such as ballots on demand were included in later election systems to increase efficiency. In 2010, Atkeson's work on the election process in the state of New Mexico earned her the Jay Taylor Best in Government Award from Common Cause New Mexico. She was also appointed the Director of the University of New Mexico's Center for the Study of Voting, Elections and Democracy and later to the Institute of Social Research.

In 2018, Atkeson was appointed an Associate Editor of the official journal of the Society for Political Methodology and the Political Methodology Section of the American Political Science Association Political Analysis.

Selected publications
Polls and Politics 
Handbook on Polling and Polling Methods
Evaluating Elections: Tools for Improvement
Confirming Elections: Creating Confidence and Integrity Through Election Auditing
Catastrophic Politics: Public Opinion and How Extraordinary Events Redefine Perceptions of Government (2013)

References

External links 

Living people
1965 births
University of New Mexico faculty
University of California, Riverside alumni
University of Colorado Boulder alumni
American women political scientists
American political scientists
Academic journal editors
American women academics
21st-century American women